Lisa Zola Greer is an American philanthropist, known for her 2020 book on philanthropy from the perspective of a donor.

Education and career 
She has an undergraduate degree from University of California, Los Angeles and was the commencement speaker at the 2018 graduation at the University of California, Los Angeles. She also earned an MBA from Pepperdine University. 

In 2020 she was appointed to the California State Commission on the Status of Women and Girls. She is on the board of the New Israel Fund.

In 2015, Greer made a donation from her donor-advised fund to IfNotNow, a Jewish activist group. The fund was held by the Jewish Community Foundation of Los Angeles, and they denied her grant due to political disagreements.

In 2020 and 2021, Greer spoke about how philanthropists make decisions regarding additional financial support needed during the COVID-19 pandemic. In 2021, she gave the keynote address at the Association of Fundraising Professionals of West Michigan Meeting.

Selected publications 

Discussed in Jacobin magazine and reviewed by Stanford Social Innovation Review and Alliance magazine Personal life 
Greer lives in Beverly Hills and was honored by the Friends of the Virginia Robinson Gardens for her contributions to the community, and front page article in The Beverly Hills Courier described her works in the community. In a 2016 article in Harper's Magazine,'' Greer discussed her installation of a lawn of drought-resistant grass in response to increasing water bills during the California drought.

References

External links 
 Official website
Thinking Like a Donor to Build Authentic Relationships with Lisa Greer, July 30, 2020 podcast with dotOrg-strategy

Living people
American philanthropists
Year of birth missing (living people)